Grounds for Marriage is a 1951 American romantic comedy film directed by Robert Z. Leonard. Written and produced by Samuel Marx, the film stars Van Johnson and Kathryn Grayson.

Plot
Ina Massine (Kathryn Grayson) is an opera diva who divorced throat specialist Dr. Lincoln "Linc" I. Bartlett (Van Johnson) three years ago. Nowadays, she regrets this decision and attempts to win back his affection. Linc, however, is engaged to Agnes Oglethorpe Young (Paula Raymond), the beautiful young daughter of his mentor, Dr. Carleton Radwin Young (Lewis Stone). Nevertheless, Ina is determined to reconcile with Linc and grabs every chance to try to seduce him. Linc remains loyal to his fiancée, though, and soon grows irritated by Ina's attempts to impress him. On the night of the premiere of her latest opera La Bohème, Ina is bothered with a sore throat and calls Dr. Young. Linc, who is replacing Dr. Young that night, suspects that Ina is faking. However, when he examines her, he diagnoses a tropical disease she had possibly gotten in South America.

Ina ignores his diagnosis and performs that night without any problems. The next morning, after becoming upset with Linc and screaming at his portrait in her apartment, she is suddenly unable to speak. She goes to see Dr. Young, who diagnoses functional aphonia, a speaking disorder caused by shocking news. Young advises psychiatric help and tells Linc that a new love interest for Ina could solve the problem. Ina is assigned as Linc's client, much to Agnes' annoyance. Although Linc assures Agnes several times he has no feelings for his ex-wife, she remains suspicious of his connection with Ina.

Linc contacts his brother, Chris Bartlett (Barry Sullivan), hoping he will be able to romance Ina. He sets up a date between the two, but Ina shows no interest in Chris, only able to think of Linc. Later that night, Ina is able to break through Linc's wall, convincing him to spend the evening with her. They enjoy drinks and dancing at a night club where they are spotted by some of Agnes' friends. On their way back home, Ina again attempts to seduce him. Although Linc does not respond to her, he seems to have softened up. A couple of nights later, with Ina staying in his apartment to take care of him, Linc, who is suffering from a severe cold, is bothered with a feverish nightmare. Linc awakens from the nightmare screaming for Ina.

When Linc wakes up, he realizes he still has feelings for his ex-wife. He goes to the couch where she had been sleeping to hug her, and her voice suddenly returns. Just then, Agnes and Chris suddenly come in. Agnes, feeling betrayed, breaks off the engagement despite Linc's attempts to explain the situation. Ina, announces she, too, is fed up with the love triangle and storms out wearing Linc's PJs. She soon returns, however, and is told by Chris that Linc is now  suffering from functional aphonia, too. Ina figures out that Linc's functional aphonia means that he still loves her; she agrees to marry him again and they kiss, thus restoring his voice.

Cast

Production
The film initially was meant to be a vehicle for June Allyson.
Robert Walker was cast as well, but he was replaced by Van Johnson. It was decided to assign Kathryn Grayson opposite him in her first non-singing role. It was Johnson and Grayson's first film together.

The film's operatic sequences were staged by Vladimir Rosing.

Reception
Grounds for Marriage was meant to be an escapist fare, distracting people from the Korean War. The film was generally received mildly, attracting only little attention and earning only little money. MGM records state that the movie earned $1,116,000 in the US and Canada and $471,000 elsewhere, resulting in a loss of $168,000.

Nevertheless, Johnson and Grayson reprised their roles in a 1952 broadcast for Lux Radio Theater.

References
Notes

Bibliography

External links
 
 
 
 

1951 films
1951 romantic comedy films
American black-and-white films
American romantic comedy films
Comedy of remarriage films
Films directed by Robert Z. Leonard
Films scored by Bronisław Kaper
Metro-Goldwyn-Mayer films
1950s English-language films
1950s American films